The Ministry of Counter Narcotics is a ministry within the government of Afghanistan.
  
The ministry leads the coordination, policy-making, monitoring and evaluation of all counter-narcotics activities and efforts. All activities are carried out in view of the Constitution of Afghanistan, the Afghan Drug Law and Afghanistan's National Drug Control Strategy (NDCS).

The role of Minister of Counter Narcotics has been described as the world's toughest job.

Functions
Opium production in Afghanistan exceeds by far the opium produced in the rest of the world.  The ministry has the lead on coordinating and evaluating the Afghan Drug Law and the NDCS.

The ministry has eight pillars of activity:

 institution building
 law enforcement
 international and regional cooperation
 eradication
 public awareness
 alternative livelihoods
 criminal justice
 demand reduction

There are four published priorities for activity:

Ministers
 Zarar Ahmad Osmani (Zarar Ahmad Moqbel) 2009–2013
 Mobarez Rashidi 2013–2015
 Salamat Azimi 2015–?

See also
Council of Ministers (Afghanistan)

References

External links
 mcn.gov.af, official website
 Prison for drug traffickers inaugurated

Ministries of the Islamic Republic of Afghanistan
Counter Narcotics
Drug control law enforcement agencies in Afghanistan